This is a list of people from Lawrence, Massachusetts.

 Laurence A. Abercrombie, triple Navy Cross recipient, Admiral, and submariner
 A. J. Antoon, Tony Award-winning theatre director
 Sarah Lord Bailey (1856–1922), elocutionist and teacher
 Fred Beal, labor-union organizer 
 Al Bernardin, inventor of the Quarter Pounder
 Leonard Bernstein, composer, conductor of New York Philharmonic, winner of a Tony Award and 18 Grammy Awards, born in Lawrence
 Colin Blackwell, professional ice hockey player
 Johnny Broaca, professional baseball player
 Patrick F. Burke, American football player
 Garrett Caples, famous poet
 Doc Casey, professional baseball player
 James A. Champy, author, management expert, retired CEO
 Ed Coleman, radio reporter, host for the New York Mets
 John William Comber, Catholic missionary and bishop
 Elaine Comparone, harpsichordist
 Bill Cronin, American football player
 Irene Daye, jazz singer
 Ferdinand Waldo Demara, "The Great Impostor"
 Anthony DeSpirito, jockey
 Marcos Devers, first Dominican-American to serve as a mayor in the U.S.
 William E. Donovan, MLB pitcher and manager
 Sully Erna, Godsmack lead singer
 Aaron Feuerstein, one of the CEOs of Malden Mills; known for his generosity, for which he was awarded the Peace Abbey Courage of Conscience Award
 Joseph D. FitzGerald, president of Fairfield University (1951–1958)
 Jocko Flynn, MLB pitcher
 Robert Frost, iconic poet, winner of four Pulitzer Prizes and a Congressional Gold Medal, a graduate of Lawrence High School
 Ziwe Fumudoh, comedian and comic writer
 Robert Goulet, Grammy-winning singer and Tony-winning actor, born in Lawrence
 Steve Holman, voice of the Atlanta Hawks
 Nicky Jam, birth name Nick Rivera Caminero, rapper and reggaeton artist, lived in Lawrence until the age of 10
 John J. Joubert (1963–1996), serial killer
 Francis Kilcoyne (died 1985), President of Brooklyn College
 William S. Knox, US congressman from 1895 to 1903
 Thomas J. Lane, U.S. congressman from March 4, 1941, to March 3, 1963
 Abbott Lawrence, founder of Lawrence, U.S. congressman, and ambassador to the United Kingdom
 Anna LoPizzo, striker killed during the Lawrence textile strike
 Sal Maccarone, sculptor
 Statik Selektah, record producer, DJ and radio personality
 Ray MacDonnell, actor
 Robert S. Maloney, U.S. congressman from 1921 to 1923
 Frank McManus, MLB catcher
 Robbie Merrill, Godsmack bassist
 Paul Monette, author, poet, and activist
 George Moolic, professional baseball player
 Ray Mungo, author of 18 books and co-founder of Liberation News Service
 Jane Ellen "Bonnie" Newman, executive dean of Harvard's Kennedy School and president of the University of New Hampshire
 Georges Niang, professional basketball player
 John O'Connell, professional baseball player
 Henry K. Oliver, Treasurer of Massachusetts from 1886 to 1889
 Endicott Peabody, Governor of Massachusetts from 1963 to 1965
 Leo Z. Penn, actor and director, father of Sean Penn
 Joe Perry, guitarist of Aerosmith
 Elizabeth Pillion, Army chemist
 Raymond Preston, NFL linebacker
 William Quinlan, NFL defensive end
 Gil Reyes, boxer, WBA, Fedecentro welterweight champion
 William Herbert Rollins, pioneer in field of radiation protection
 Dave Rozumek, NFL player
 William A. Russell, U.S. congressman from 1879 to 1885
 James Michael Shannon, Attorney General of Massachusetts and CEO of National Fire Protection Association
 Edgar J. Sherman, Attorney General of Massachusetts and Associate Justice of the Massachusetts Superior Court
 Bethann Siviter, expatriate British nurse leader and author
 John K. Tarbox, U.S. congressman from 1875 to 1877 and Mayor of Lawrence from (1873–1875)
 Ernest Thayer, writer and poet, Casey at the Bat
 Thelma Todd, actress
 Emily Greene Wetherbee, poet and educator
 John E. White, Auditor of Massachusetts July 6, 1911 to 1914
 Michael C. Wholley, general counsel for NASA
 William M. Wood, co-founder of American Woolen Company

References

Lawrence
Lawrence